Nadir Haroub Ali (born 10 February 1982) is a Tanzanian former footballer who last played for Young Africans FC as a defender. He is one among club's long serving member as he played more than 200 games in his 16-year spell with Young Africans.

Haroub's nickname Cannavaro is in reference to the way he plays the game as a defender similar to Fabio Cannavaro.

Nadir Haroub was made Young Africans and Tanzania national team captain after the retirement of long serving captain Shadrack Nsajigwa in 2012. Also he captained Zanzibar national team in most Cecafa tournaments and friendly matches during his playing time. 
After his retirement, Haroub remained with Young Africans SC as first team coach during 2017 to 2019.

Career 
On 13 August 2009 left Young Africans FC of the Tanzanian Premier League who played from 2006 to 2009 on loan to Vancouver Whitecaps Residency, formerly played one season in the Zanzibar Premier League.

International career 
Haroub represented the Tanzania national football team in qualifying matches for the FIFA World Cup and the Africa Cup of Nations, and in friendly matches. He capped 13 times for Tanzania in three different editions of the FIFA World Cup qualifiers (2010, 2014 and 2018). Being Zanzibari, he played for the Zanzibar national football team in seven editions of the CECAFA Cup (from 2007 to 2012, and 2015).

International goals for Tanzania
Scores and results list Tanzania's goal tally first.

International goals for Zanzibar
Scores and results list Zanzibar's goal tally first.

References

External links

1982 births
Living people
People from Mjini Magharibi Region
Tanzanian footballers
Zanzibari footballers
Association football defenders
Young Africans S.C. players
Vancouver Whitecaps Residency players
Tanzania international footballers
Zanzibar international footballers
Tanzanian expatriate footballers
Expatriate soccer players in Canada
Tanzanian Premier League players
Tanzania A' international footballers
2009 African Nations Championship players
Tanzanian expatriate sportspeople in Canada